Elachista fulgens is a moth of the family Elachistidae. It is found in Italy, Germany, the Netherlands and Japan (Kyûsyû, Ryûkyû; Honsyû).

The forewings have a silvery spot just basally of the tornal spot.

The larvae feed on Carex acutiformis, Carex elata and Carex riparia. They mine the leaves of their host plant.

Taxonomy
Some authors list Elachista arnoldi as a synonym of Elachista fulgens.

References

fulgens
Moths described in 1983
Moths of Europe
Moths of Japan